Stanford Counterpoint (also known simply as Counterpoint) is an all-femme a cappella group from Stanford University. It is the second-oldest a cappella group from Stanford and the oldest female a cappella group on the West Coast.

Counterpoint is a student-led group, and typically comprises 15–17 singers, selected by audition each September. As of 2020, Counterpoint has released fourteen studio albums. The group has been nominated for a dozen national a cappella awards, and has been featured three times on Varsity Vocals' annual Best Of College A Cappella album.

History 

The group was founded in 1979 by sophomores Linda Chin and Joyce Rogers, to provide a female-oriented alternative to the Stanford Mendicants, an all-male group and the only a cappella group on campus at the time. The group was named "Counterpoint" because Rogers played the Harpsichord in high school and the concept of musical counterpoint is essential to the Baroque music she enjoyed playing. At first, the women of Counterpoint performed with an upright bass and occasional other instruments. The group's first performed song ("Java Jive") featured an upright bass and received a standing ovation at their first performance in the spring of 1979.

That first year, the group won the Stanford Alumni Association's award for the "most innovative student project" of the year.

In 1980, Counterpoint took The Mendicants on a tour to perform for Stanford alumni in Southern California; as of 2019, that tradition continues—as does the lasting relationship between the groups. In 1982, Counterpoint released a self-titled vinyl record, recorded in Stanford's Memorial Church.

In the 1990s, the group ceased using instruments and became all-vocal. Counterpoint recorded a studio album every other year, touring the United States during the years they didn't record. In 2019, the women of Counterpoint went on their first international tour to Paris, France. Also in 2019, Stanford Counterpoint celebrated their 40th anniversary with a reunion concert featuring generations of alumnae.

In 2019, Stanford Counterpoint released their 14th studio album (Close to Home) and an accompanying music video for the track "God is a Woman". Both works are entirely performed/recorded/produced by women. The track "Light of a Clear Blue Morning" was selected for the Recorded A Cappella Review Board's 2019 "Picks of the Year" and their music video for has been nominated for an A Cappella Video Award.

As of 2020, Counterpoint has been nominated for 14 a cappella recording-related awards and honors including Contemporary A Cappella Recording Award (CARA) award nominations and Best Of College A Cappella (BOCA) compilation album features. Many of these nominations were thanks to the work of Counterpoint's long-time audio engineer Bill Hare.

Discography 
As of 2020, Counterpoint has released fourteen studio albums:
 Counterpoint (1981)
 Run With It (1989)
 Sing It, Baby! (1992)
 Nomansland (1996)
 Counterculture (1998)
 Ticket to Anywhere (2000)
 Cover Charge (2002)
 Studio Confessions (2004)
 Lights in the Rearview (2006)
 Belladonna (2008)
 Dancing Til Dawn (2010)
 No Turning Back (2015)
 A Woman Like That (2016) - EP
 Close to Home (2019)

Awards and nominations 

|-
| 1997
| rowspan="10" | Contemporary A Cappella Recording Awards
| Best Female Collegiate Album
| Nomansland
| 
| 
|-
| rowspan="4" | 1999
| Best Female Collegiate Album
| Counterculture
| 
| rowspan="4" | 
|-
| Best Female Collegiate Song
| "Don't Speak"
| 
|-
| Best Female Collegiate Arrangement
| Katy Chow
| 
|-
| Best Female Collegiate Soloist
| Sasha Polonsky
| 
|-
| rowspan="3" | 2001
| Best Female Collegiate Album
| Ticket to Anywhere
| 
| rowspan="3" | 
|-
| Best Female Collegiate Song
| "Good Enough"
| 
|-
| best Female Collegiate Arrangement
| Katy Chow for "Crush"
| 
|-
| 2005
| Best Female Collegiate Song
| "Clocks" from Studio Confessions
| 
| 
|-
| 2009
| Best Female Collegiate Album
| Belladona
| style="background: #FADEDE" | 
| 
|-
| 2019
| rowspan="2" | A Cappella Video Awards
| Best Female Collegiate Video
| "Don't Wake Me Up"
| style="background: #F4F2B0" | 
| 
|-
| rowspan="2" | 2020
| Best Female Collegiate Video
| "God Is a Woman"
| 
| 
|-
| Contemporary A Cappella Recording Awards
| Best Country Song
| "Light of a Clear Blue Morning" from Close to Home
| 
|

Best of College A Cappella appearances 

Three songs released by Counterpoint have been selected for Varsity Vocals’ annual Best of College A Cappella album.

See also 

 List of Stanford University a cappella groups

References

External links 

 Official Counterpoint website
 Official Counterpoint YouTube channel

Counterpoint
Counterpoint
Counterpoint
History of women in California